Sunshine Records was an Australian independent pop music record label of the mid-1960s. It was established in late 1964 by promoter Ivan Dayman in collaboration with musician-producer-arranger-songwriter Pat Aulton and entrepreneur, producer and songwriter Nat Kipner (who subsequently founded the Spin Records label). Although his enterprise was short-lived, Dayman was arguably the first Australian popular music entrepreneur to create a fully integrated pop music company that included artist management and bookings, record production, record labels, venue management and concert promotion.

Most of the label's releases were made in the period 1965–67. Its biggest act was solo singer Normie Rowe, Australia's top male pop star from 1965 to 1968, who scored a string of Australian hit singles including "It Ain't Necessarily So", "I (Who Have Nothing)", "Que Sera Sera" and "Shakin' All Over".

History

Label founder Ivan Dayman reportedly ran a gravel quarry in his hometown of Adelaide, South Australia before moving into pop management and promotion in the early 1960s. He was very successful for a few years and at its height in 1965-66 his Sunshine group included two record labels, a concert promotion and booking agency, artist management and a string of venues in capital cities and major towns from Adelaide to north Queensland, including the famed Cloudland Ballroom in Brisbane.

In late 1964 Dayman expanded his business by establishing the Sunshine label, to record and produce the pop artists he already had under contract and to launch new discoveries. The label's parent company, Sunshine Productions, was a partnership between Dayman, expatriate American entrepreneur Nat Kipner and musician Pat Aulton. Kipner had teamed up with Dayman when the latter expanded his pop promotions into Brisbane, where Nat was producing TV pop shows for Channel 7, among many other ventures; he also ran a record store, wrote comedy skits and songs for the George Wallace Jr TV variety show Theatre Royal, ran a small publishing company with Johnny Devlin, and wrote songs with Devlin, country musician Geoff Mack (author of "I've Been Everywhere") and Nat's teenage son Steve Kipner. Pat Aulton had met Dayman in Adelaide in the early Sixties while fronting The Clefs; Dayman hired him to work as an MC and opening act for his concerts, and Aulton eventually became Sunshine's musical director and house producer.

Sunshine established a manufacturing and distribution deal with by Festival Records, similar to those that Festival made with other contemporary independent labels including Clarion Records, Spin Records and Albert Productions. Sunshine was (in local terms) a relatively productive label, with over 100 singles, more than 30 EPs and at least dozen LPs released between 1964 and 1971.

This is a similar volume of releases to its successor, Spin Records, and both labels existed for a similar time-span, but while Sunshine and Spin released almost identical numbers of singles and EPs, Spin issued many more LPs. This difference can be explained by the rapid growth in sale of LPs in the late 1960s and early 1970s. During Sunshine's peak period from 1964 to 1967, singles and EPs were by far the biggest selling vinyl formats in Australia while LPs—still something of a luxury at that time—formed only a small percentage of total record sales.

In early 1964 Dayman took over the Saturday night lease on Melbourne Festival Hall and renamed it "Mersey City". On 2 May 1964 the venue opened with Tony Worsley & The Fabulous Blue Jays, attended by over 4500 teenagers. Dayman also used Worsley and the Blue Jays to open several other Queensland venues in Bundaberg, Toowoomba, Ipswich, Inala, Surfers Paradise and the city and by the end of the year, with the success of their first single, they were one of the hottest pop acts in the country.

The first Sunshine single release, in October 1964, was the single "Jay Walker" by The Blue Jays, who were already well established in their home town of Melbourne and had released instrumental singles on the small Crest label. In early 1964 Dayman teamed the band with a young Brisbane singer, Tony Worsley. The Blue Jays continued to release records under their own name, but it was the teaming of The Blue Jays with Worsley that launched Sunshine on the national pop scene. In November 1964 Sunshine issued the first single jointly credited to Tony Worsley and The Fabulous Blue Jays, "Sure Know A Lot About Love", which charted in Brisbane, and the band broke through in other capitals with a their powerful version of Rosco Gordon's "Just A Little Bit" in early 1965.

Another notable early release was the Pat Aulton-produced single "Lost My Baby"/"Slowly But Surely" by The Pacifics, a Brisbane-based four-piece instrumental group that had previously recorded two instrumental singles for EMI's Parlophone label, produced by Nat Kipner. The B-side of their second single was written by Nat's young son Steve Kipner, who went on to front Sydney-based beat band Steve & The Board and subsequently formed the British-based pop duo Tin Tin with fellow Australian Steve Groves.

Sunshine's greatest success was solo singer Normie Rowe, who scored a string of major Australian hits between 1965 and 1968, and his double-A-sided 1965 single "Que Sera Sera" / "Shakin' All Over" became one of the biggest-selling local hits of the 1960s and is still one of the biggest selling Australian singles of all time.

The Sunshine roster featured several male solo singers including Normie Rowe, Peter Doyle (who later joined The Virgil Brothers and The New Seekers) and Mike Furber. Its more 'left field' signings included hardcore Brisbane blues-R&B band The Purple Hearts, highly rated NZ pop/R&B group The Librettos, Tony Worsley & The Fabulous Blue Jays, Normie Rowe's backing band The Playboys, Marcie Jones & The Cookies, highly rated Sydney teen singer Toni McCann, renowned surf band The Atlantics, Ricky & Tammy, Melbourne's feedback kings Running Jumping Standing Still, NZ folk duo Bill & Boyd, Rev. Black & The Rockin' Vicars, popular Brisbane solo star Jonne Sands and Brisbane pop band Wickedy Wak, whose Sunshine single "Billie's Bikie Boys"—the recording debut of future star Rick Springfield—was produced by Ian "Molly" Meldrum.

Many earlier Sunshine recordings, including most of Rowe's early singles and albums, were produced by Nat Kipner, but in late 1965 Kipner sold his share in Sunshine and the Sydney Bowl nightclub. During mid-1966 Kipner collaborated with independent producer Ossie Byrne on the short-lived Downunder Records. During this period he briefly took over the management of The Bee Gees and persuaded Festival's Leedon label to release the band from their contract and signed them to the newly established Spin Records, which he had just joined as A&R manager. Following Kipner's departure, Pat Aulton took over as Sunshine's main producer, but both he and Kipner also produced recordings on Sunshine's short-lived sister label Kommotion, which was set up to promote the acts who appeared on the TV pop show of the same name. Aulton produced and engineered many later Sunshine singles and albums, as well as providing uncredited vocal and instrumental backing and contributing to arrangements.

Sunshine Productions ran into serious financial problems around the end of 1966, but the full story behind the company's collapse is still not known. Pop historian Bill Casey has suggested that the financial strain of Normie Rowe's extended overseas stay was a contributing factor, but it seems likely that the main cause of the company's demise was Dayman's questionable business practices. The Kommotion label folded at the start of 1967, and Sunshine was taken over by Festival and become a wholly owned subsidiary label.

After the collapse of Sunshine, Pat Aulton discovered that Dayman had made him a director of the company without his knowledge, and when Sunshine's creditors moved in to recover their debts, Aulton's unwitting liability cost him his car, furniture and other assets. Fortunately, he was by then well known to Festival managing director Fred Marks, who rescued Aulton with the offer of a position as a staff producer at Festival. It is not known whether Dayman retained any interest or played any role in the company after 1967, although he continued to operate his promotions and management business in several cities.

Sunshine's recording assets were acquired by its distributor, Festival Records during 1967. The label's releases declined rapidly from this point and it ceased operations after two final singles released during 1971.

The Sunshine catalogue remained in the archive of Festival Records until that company went into liquidation in 2005, when the combined Festival-Mushroom Records recording archive was sold to the Australian division of the Warner Music Group for a reported A$10 million.

Discography

Singles

Credits:

See also 
 List of record labels

References 

Record labels established in 1964
Defunct record labels of Australia
Pop record labels